SHeDAISY was an American country music group composed of sisters Kassidy, Kelsi and Kristyn Osborn. The trio recorded for Lyric Street Records between 1999 and 2010, releasing five studio albums, one compilation album, one remix album, 14 singles and two Christmas songs for the label. Of the trio's albums, 1999's The Whole SHeBANG is certified platinum by the Recording Industry Association of America, and 2004's Sweet Right Here is certified gold. Four of the group's singles have reached Top Ten on the Billboard Hot Country Songs charts, with the highest being the number two hit "I Will… But" from 2000.

Albums

Studio albums

Compilation albums

Remix albums

Singles

Christmas singles

Music videos

Notes

References

Country music discographies
Discographies of American artists